Motherlode is a 1988 James Brown compilation album. Created as a follow-up to the successful 1986 compilation In the Jungle Groove, it similarly focuses on Brown's funk recordings of the late 1960s and early 1970s. It includes live performances and remixes as well as studio recordings, most of them previously unissued. Writing in 2007, critic Robert Christgau called it "the finest of the classic [James Brown] comps". Highlights include a live "Say It Loud – I'm Black and I'm Proud", the first album release of "I Got Ants in My Pants (and I Want to Dance)", the latter-day UK chart hit "She's the One", and a nine-minute-long remix of "People Get Up and Drive Your Funky Soul" from the Slaughter's Big Rip-Off soundtrack.

In 2003 Motherlode was reissued with remastered sound, an unedited version of the track "Can I Get Some Help", and two bonus tracks, the 1969 song "You've Changed" and an alternate mix of 1976's "Bodyheat".

Track listing

Original 1988 release
Side A
"There It Is" (Live) – 3:06
"She's the One" – 2:52
"Since You Been Gone" (Duet with Bobby Byrd) – 5:33
"Untitled Instrumental" – 3:22
"Say It Loud (Say It Live)" – 4:52
"Can I Get Some Help" – 4:56

Side B
"You Got to Have a Mother for Me" – 5:10
"Funk Bomb" (Instrumental) – 4:12
"Baby Here I Come" – 4:27
"People Get Up and Drive Your Funky Soul" (Remix) – 9:04

Original 1988 CD bonus track
11. "I Got Ants in My Pants (and I Want to Dance)" (Remix) – 7:27

Expanded 2003 release

Personnel 
 Vocals – James Brown (tracks: 1 to 3, 5 to 7, 9 to 13)
 Alto saxophone, tenor saxophone – Maceo Parker (tracks: 2, 5 to 10) 
 Bass – "Sweet" Charles Sherrell (tracks: 2, 5 to 7, 9), William "Bootsy" Collins (tracks: 3 and 4), Fred Thomas (tracks: 1, 10, 11)
 Drums – Clyde Stubblefield (tracks: 3 to 5, 8, 12), John "Jabo" Starks (tracks: 1, 4, 5, 9, 11), Melvin Parker (tracks: 2, 5, 6, 13), Nate Jones (track: 7), John Morgan (track: 10) 
 Guitar – Alfonzo Kellum (tracks: 2, 5 to 9), Hearlon "Cheese" Martin (tracks: 1, 4, 11), Jimmy Nolen (tracks: 1, 2, 5 to 10, 12 to 13), Phelps "Catfish" Collins (tracks: 3 and 4) 
 Percussion – Johnny Griggs (tracks: 1, 3, 4, 10) 
 Tenor saxophone – Eldee Williams (tracks: 2, 5, 9) 
 Tenor saxophone, baritone saxophone – St. Clair Pinckney (tracks: 1, 4 to 11) 
 Trombone – Fred Wesley (tracks: 1, 2, 5 to 7, 9 to 11) 
 Trumpet – Jerone Jasaan Sanford (tracks: 1, 4, 11), Joseph Davis (tracks: 2, 5, 6, 9), Richard Griffith (tracks: 2, 5 to 7, 9)

References

External links 
 

James Brown albums
Polydor Records albums
1988 compilation albums